Jeffrey Linden Dedmon (born March 4, 1960) is an American former professional baseball player, a right-handed pitcher who appeared in 250  Major League games over six seasons for the Atlanta Braves (1983–1987) and Cleveland Indians (1988).

A starting pitcher for his first two years in minor league baseball, he converted to a reliever during his third professional campaign, and when he reached the Major Leagues in September 1983 he continued in that role, making only three starts in his big-league career. Dedmon worked in over 50 games for four consecutive seasons (1984–1987) with the Braves (although the first two of those seasons included time spent with the Triple-A Richmond Braves). He was traded to the Indians on the eve of the  season and split that year between Cleveland and the Triple-A Colorado Springs Sky Sox.

In 394 big-league innings pitched, Dedmon allowed 387 hits and 186 bases on balls.  He struck out 210 and recorded 12 saves.  Dedmon retired after the 1989 season, his tenth in organized baseball.

References

External links
, or Retrosheet, or Pura Pelota (Venezuelan Winter League

1960 births
Living people
Anderson Braves players
Atlanta Braves players
Baseball players from Torrance, California
Cleveland Indians players
Colorado Springs Sky Sox players
Durham Bulls players
Gulf Coast Braves players
Indianapolis Indians players
Major League Baseball pitchers
Richmond Braves players
Savannah Braves players
Tiburones de La Guaira players
American expatriate baseball players in Venezuela
West Los Angeles College alumni
West Los Angeles Wildcats baseball players